Squaw Lake may refer to:

 Squaw Lake, Minnesota, USA; a city in Itasca County
 Nüümü Hu Hupi, USA; a lake in John Muir Wilderness, Sierra Nevada, Fresno County. Formerly known as "Squaw Lake"
 East Indian Lake, USA; a lake in Kalkaska County, Michigan formerly known as "Squaw Lake"
 Muskrat Lake (New York), USA; a lake in Hamilton County formerly known as "Squaw Lake"
 Eight lakes in Wisconsin; all formerly known as some variation of "Squaw Lake"
 Schefferville/Squaw Lake Water Aerodrome (Transport Canada id: CSZ9) aka "Squaw Lake" (airport)

See also

Comanche Creek Reservoir, Texas, USA
Granite Mountain Reservoir, Nevada, USA
Squaw Humper Dam, South Dakota, USA
 Squaw (disambiguation)
 Lake (disambiguation)